The 2018–19 West Ham United F.C. Women season was the club's 28th season in existence and their first in the FA Women's Super League, the highest level of the football pyramid and their first as a fully professional team. Along with competing in the WSL, the club also contested two domestic cup competitions: the FA Cup and the League Cup.

On 28 May 2018, it was announced that West Ham United Ladies had been granted a WSL licence, promoting the team from the third-tier FA Women's Premier League. Rosie Kmita and Vyan Sampson were the only players to remain with the club and sign on professional terms following promotion. Former WSL winner Matt Beard was appointed head coach on 7 June 2018. They changed their name to West Ham United F.C. Women in July 2018.

The season was also notable as the subject of the BBC behind-the-scenes documentary Britain's Youngest Football Boss.

Squad

FA Women's Super League

Results summary

Results

League table

Women's FA Cup

FA Women's League Cup

Group stage

Knockout phase

Squad statistics

Appearances 

Starting appearances are listed first, followed by substitute appearances after the + symbol where applicable.

|}

Goalscorers

Transfers

Transfers in

References 

West Ham United